Krentz is a surname. Notable people with the surname include:

Dale Krentz (born 1961), professional ice hockey player, played 30 games in the National Hockey League
Jayne Ann Krentz, née Jayne Castle, American writer of romance novels
Matthew Scott Krentz, also known as Matt Krentz, (born 1976), American director, producer and actor
Robert Krentz (1951–2010), prominent rancher in the U.S. state of Arizona
Torsten Krentz (born 1966), East German sprint canoeist, competed in the late 1980s and early 1990s

See also
Karenz
Krantz